The Best American Sports Writing was a yearly anthology of magazine articles on the subject of sports published in the United States.  It started in 1991 as part of The Best American Series published by Houghton Mifflin and ceased publication in 2020. It was preceded by the Best American Sports Stories (1945-1991) and succeeded by The Year’s Best Sports Stories (2021-present), published by Triumph Books. 

Articles were chosen using the same procedure as other titles in the Best American Series; the series editor chose about 70-100 article candidates, from which the guest editor picked 25 or so for publication; many, but not all of the remaining runner-up articles were listed in the appendix. The series has been edited since its inception by Glenn Stout.

Traditionally loaded with long-form feature stories and an occasional column, the annual book is considered a must-read by many sports writers, though the reach of its influence is debatable. Authors who have appeared in the series five or more times in its history are: Gary Smith (13 times), Wright Thompson (12), Steve Friedman (10), S.L. Price (nine), Charles P. Pierce (nine), William Nack (seven), Rick Reilly (seven), Roger Angell (seven), Pat Jordan (seven), Rick Telander (seven), Linda Robertson (six), Paul Solotaroff (six), Chris Jones (six), Chris Ballard (six), Mark Kram Jr. (five), Bill Plaschke (five), Peter Richmond (five) and Steve Rushin (five). 

It also includes award-winning writers whose genre is not exclusively sports writing, such as Jeanne Marie Laskas whose 2008 piece "G-L-O-R-Y!" offered a rare look at professional cheerleaders. The series includes the Best American Sports Writing of the Century, published in 2000. The guest editor for that book was David Halberstam, who also served as the guest editor for the first edition of the series, in 1991.

Guest editors
Selected from the cream of the sports journalism crop, nearly every guest editor has had at least one story published in a previous or later edition of the book. The only exceptions are John Feinstein, and Dick Schaap (whose work appeared twice in the Best American Sports Writing of the Century anthology).

 1991: David Halberstam
 1992: Thomas McGuane
 1993: Frank Deford
 1994: Thomas Boswell
 1995: Dan Jenkins
 1996: John Feinstein
 1997: George Plimpton
 1998: Bill Littlefield
 1999: Richard Ford
 2000: Dick Schaap
 2001: Bud Collins
 2002: Rick Reilly
 2003: Buzz Bissinger
 2004: Richard Ben Cramer

 2005: Mike Lupica
 2006: Michael Lewis
 2007: David Maraniss
 2008: William Nack
 2009: Leigh Montville
 2010: Peter Gammons
 2011: Jane Leavy
 2012: Michael Wilbon
 2013: J.R. Moehringer
 2014: Christopher McDougall
 2015: Wright Thompson
 2016: Rick Telander
 2017: Howard Bryant
 2018: Jeff Pearlman
 2019: Charles P. Pierce
 2020: Jackie MacMullan

References

Book series introduced in 1991
Sports Writing
Books about sports
Houghton Mifflin books